Yang Zexiang (born 14 December 1994) is a Chinese footballer currently playing as a right-back for Shanghai Shenhua.

Club career
Yang Zexiang would play for the Tianjin TEDA youth team before being promoted to the senior team in the 2015 Chinese Super League campaign and would make his debut appearance in a Chinese FA Cup game against Xinjiang Tianshan Leopard on 8 July 2015 in a 1-0 defeat. After several seasons he was loaned out to second tier football club Baoding Yingli ETS to gain some playing time. The following he transferred to Dalian Transcendence.

At the end of the 2018 league campaign Dalian Transcendence quit the professional league and Yang Zexiang was free to transfer to Dalian Pro. He would not make any senior appearances for Dalian Pro and joined another top tier club in Shanghai Shenhua who loaned him out to second tier club Chengdu Rongcheng where he gained promotion with them at the end of the 2021 China League One campaign.

Career statistics
.

References

External links

1994 births
Living people
Chinese footballers
Association football defenders
China League One players
Tianjin Jinmen Tiger F.C. players
Dalian Transcendence F.C. players
Dalian Professional F.C. players
Shanghai Shenhua F.C. players
Chengdu Rongcheng F.C. players